Dah or DAH may refer to:
Morse code symbol
Dah, Ivory Coast, a village in Montagnes District
Dah, Ladakh, a village in Jammu and Kashmir, India
Dah, Mali, a town in Ségou Region
Dah (band), former Yugoslav/Belgian band
 Air Algérie (ICAO code: DAH), Algerian airline
 Gwahatike language, a PNG Finisterre language, ISO 639 code dah
 Dominica Award of Honour, an award of the Commonwealth of Dominica - postnominal letters are 'D.A.H.'